is an anime television series created and written by Shōji Kawamori. The series premiered in Japan on WOWOW between January 9, 2001 and March 29, 2001, spanning a total of 13 episodes. It centers on a dysfunctional family tasked with defending the Earth from alien invaders.

The series was aired by the anime television network Animax across its respective networks worldwide, including its English language networks in Southeast Asia and South Asia under the title The Family's Defensive Alliance. It was released on DVD in North America by Geneon under the title The Daichis: Earth Defence Family, but was not broadcast across the region.

Plot
The opening scenes of the anime show the Daichis in a furious argument over a divorce petition. Suddenly a bright flash of light blinds them completely and they are shown their future roles to be played as defenders of the earth.
Reluctant at first, they are forced to accept the responsibility, as refusal means a court-martial from the Galaxy Federation (their employers) and a hundred years of penal servitude. Seiko always gets infuriated at the end of every mission as every weapon they use costs them more money than they are paid for doing their job(s). In fact, this reason is used as a basis for one of the later episodes in the show. 
As earth's defenders, they have to fight against threats the earth faces from extraterrestrials.  Extraterrestrial design is frequently bizarre, ranging from floating eyes, to alien toys, to heart shaped spacecraft, to a floating weapons factory, to a giant plant. Notably, one is an alien in the form of the Soviet Emblem that uses a hammer-and-sickle attack.  The anime ends fairly predictably, with the Daichis becoming a close knit family once again, despite the hurdles faced by them as earth's defenders and their future responsibility as the same.

Main characters
 

A problem child of the worst kind, he is hyperactive and doesn't think twice before he does anything, which usually puts him in a spot most of the time. He hates his dysfunctional family life, but at times is capable of showing considerable filial emotions and loyalty. And he has a big-time problem with his arrogant sister, Nozomi although, he still cares.
He also has an unusual pet with him which he names "Weird", possibly owing to its very unusual nature.

 

Dai's older sister with a severe attitude problem. It is shown in the anime to have originated owing to her mother making her do all the housework. She is for the most part a misunderstood and very confused young lady. She has an optimistic side as well but it appears very rarely. She has a liking for rock music and it is shown in the third episode of the anime. she does get very annoyed by Dai but, nevertheless still cares for him.

 

A flirtatious, money-hungry lady and a snob who is the mother of Nozomi and Dai. She is extremely mean and has a hint of sadism. She is extremely vain and cares for nothing save for herself, and has a very irritable temper. These attitudes are shown to gradually disappear towards the end of the anime.
She also has an affair during the series with a colleague at work, Hayakawa, a photographer by profession....Though she breaks up with him a little before the end of the anime. Despite her meanness, she does love her family deeply from within. It is not apparent though at first as in the very first episode, the opening scene is the family on the brink of being torn apart by a divorce petition about to be filed by Seiko.

 

Dai and Nozomi's father who is a half-absent IT-professional, he is almost always clueless about the situation around him. Very, very fat, he is shown in his lighter moments with some kind of food in his hand all the time. But the man is highly intelligent and sensitive otherwise. Is also a wimp and an easily terrified fellow.
Mild-mannered and easily frightened, he is the most hilarious member in the cast. But he dearly loves his family and is very reluctant to let the family be broken. He is very kind and gentle and fundamentally very decent, but very absent-minded and awkwardly slow and clumsy, especially in social situations.

 

The alien who recruited the Daichis as an earth defense force, she is a very small girl, appearing the same age as Daichi. Level-headed for the most part, she oversees the functionality of the defensive group and reports to her superiors about their status from time to time. She is also the one who makes sure that the identities of the "superhumans" as the public calls them, are never discovered. It seems that Daichi has a crush on her and the feeling seems to be mutual. It's revealed in Episode 13 that Ellen is in fact a fairy-like giant with powers to teleport and strong enough to withstand a nuclear explosion and takes orders (which she questions) aboard a silver-saucer spaceship. Flashbacks hint Ellen as a baby was rocketed off her home planet before it exploded.

Episodes

{|class="wikitable" style="width:100%; margin:auto; background:#FFF;"
|-
! style="width:30px;"| # !! Title !! Script !! style="width:150px;"| Original air date

|}

Staff
Screenplay, Original Story Concept, and Mechanical Designs: Shōji KawamoriDirector: Tetsu Kimura

Music
Shigeo Naka of The Surf Coasters provides the score for the anime.

Reception
The show was generally, although not universally, well received. Chris Beveridge of Mania.com called it "an under the radar show that's been quite a lot of fun" and said "With just three volumes it's a great little show to check out with little commitment and definitely qualifies as one of those rough gems that you come across when you aren't looking for it." Carlo Santos, writing for Anime News Network,  "The idea of lampooning clichéd anime genres is nothing new, but The Daichis is one of the few shows that gets it right...  Even amid the absurdity, there are some remarkably true-to-life moments... that make The Daichis a real family story and not just a farce." Santos urged readers "Don't miss out on this surprisingly good series."

John Sinnett on DVD Talk highly recommended it as "a funny show that always brings a smile to my face."

In a review for DVD Verdict.com, Joel Pearce was "not impressed" with the series after watching the first two DVD volumes from Geneon: "The biggest problem with the series is the development team's reliance on the same small well of jokes, and it's already getting dry." However he did acknowledge the anime's "solid animation and voice work" and said that "Whether you choose to listen to the original language track or the English dub, the characters are well-portrayed, and just as annoying as your own dysfunctional family."

References

External links
 Official Bandai Visual website 
 
 

2001 anime television series debuts
Bandai Visual
Comedy anime and manga
Geneon USA
Group TAC
Science fiction anime and manga
Anime with original screenplays
Wowow original programming